Netherworld (nether, ″beneath, lower″) may refer to:

Underworld, a region thought to be beneath the surface of the world in many religions and mythologies

Film and television
Netherworld (film), a 1992 American horror film
Nether World, a 1997 film starring Mark Sheppard
"Netherworld" (The Dead Zone), an episode of The Dead Zone
Netherworld, the fictional source of all villains in Power Rangers Samurai

Literature
Netherworld (DC Comics), a fictional autonomous neighborhood of the city of Chicago
Netherworld (Runelords), an alternate plane of existence in The Runelords novel series by David Farland
The Nether World, an 1889 novel by George Gissing
Netherworld (Marvel Comics), in the Marvel Comics universe, a city ruled by Kala
Netherworld, a fictional collaboration of low-lying countries united to combat the effects of global climate change in the 2021 novel Termination Shock by Neal Stephenson

Other uses
Netherworld (video game), a 1988 computer game
Netherworld Haunted House, a walk-through dark attraction established in 1997, in Atlanta, Georgia
Netherworld, a fictional location in the video game Perfect Cherry Blossom
The Nether, a dimension in the video game Minecraft
The Netherworld, a dimension where the Dark Signers originated from, in the anime Yu-Gi-Oh! 5D's
Netherworlds, parallel universes in the video game Disgaea

See also 
Hell (disambiguation)
Nether region (disambiguation)
Netherlands (disambiguation)
Spirit world (disambiguation)